Akhila Anand aka Akhila Shyam Sai is a playback singer in the Malayalam Film industry. She is also a stage performer, Television artiste and Compere' in Kerala.

Early life 
Akhila Anand was born in Trivandrum City, India in Oct 1982. She started school at Poojapura Govt Lower Primary School, did her primary and secondary education at Sisu Vihar and Cotton Hill Girls High School. Post school she did pre degree course in NSS College and graduated in Commerce from Tandem.
Her musical sojourn was set on track by Saraswathi Ammal, under whom she trained in Carnatic Music for five years. She was later given advanced musical classes by Dr Bhagya Lakshmi, She also had the opportunity to be trained by noted singer Ramesh Narayan and Perumbavoor G Raveendranath.

Career 
Akhila Anand's musical career started with her song 'Azhakarnilla Manjacharaadillay Poothali', a duet in the movie Ashwaroodan, directed by Jayaraj. The music was composed by Jassie Gift. She has hence rendered more than forty songs for various Malayalam Films. One of the other hits that is noted is the song Kalkkanda Malayil in the movie chocolate composed by Alex Paul and penned by Vayalar Sarath Chandra Varma.
Akhila is also active in the television circuit. She has been involved in various TV shows like Climax on Kairali TV aired in 2000. In 2002 she anchored Global Greetings followed by Chithra Jalakam and Hridayaragam, all on Asianet. Her recent TV programs include Symphony in Kairali TV and Suvarna Geethangal in Surya TV.
She is also a stage artiste and has done many shows during the Onam Week Celebrations in Kerala along with many other programs. She is active in anchoring shows in and out of Kerala. She continues to sing playback for Malayalam Movies. Akhila was one of the 12 jury members of Sa Re Ga Ma Pa Keralam Li'l Champs, the 2021 music based competition program on Zee Keralam Channel.

list of Akhila Anand's film songs

References 

https://timesofindia.indiatimes.com/tv/news/malayalam/akhila-anand-and-jassie-gift-on-onnum-onnum-moonnu/articleshow/62672981.cms
https://www.vanitha.in/celluloid/gossips/enge-enathu-kavithai-cover-video.html
https://timesofindia.indiatimes.com/entertainment/events/kochi/Akhila-Anand-spotted-at-the-documentry-screening-on-M-K-Arjunan-in-Thiruvananthapuram/articleshow/45616045.cms
https://www.manoramanews.com/daily-programs/pulervela/2018/04/06/akhila-anand-in-pularvela.html
https://timesofindia.indiatimes.com/entertainment/malayalam/movies/news/joseph-makers-release-a-new-song-titled-karineela-kannulla-from-the-film/articleshow/66603195.cms
https://www.asianetnews.com/entertainment/new-song-in-malayalam-movie-joseph-pil8fd
https://timesofindia.indiatimes.com/city/kochi/ode-to-vayalar-and-prem-nazir/articleshow/67601861.cms

External links
 http://www.akhilaanand.com
 https://www.malayalachalachithram.com/listsongs.php?g=8106
 https://www.jiosaavn.com/artist/akhila-anand-songs/wguKDluvTzQ_
 https://www.hungama.com/artist/akhila-anand/93323/
 https://en.msidb.org/songs.php?singers=Akhila%20Anand&singtype=solo&tag=Search&limit=4&sortorder=5&sorttype=2

Living people
Indian stage actresses
Indian television news anchors
Malayalam playback singers
1982 births